Below is the list of coalition governments in the history of Turkey.

The list

Key

|
CHP:		
CKMP:		
MP2:		                                     			
YTP:			
AP:			
MHP:	
MGP		
CGP:
DP			
MSP:			
RP:				
DSP:			
ANAP:				
DYP:				
SHP:		
DTP:
|
Republican People's Party
Republican Peasants' Nation Party
Nation Party (Turkey, 1962)                                     		
New Turkey Party (1961)	
Justice Party (Turkey)	
Nationalist Movement Party
National Reliance Party	
Republican Reliance Party
Democratic Party	
National Salvation Party	
Welfare Party		
Democratic Left Party (Turkey)	
Motherland Party (Turkey)		
True Path Party		
Social Democratic Populist Party (Turkey)
Democrat Turkey Party

See also
 List of cabinets of Turkey
 List of prime ministers of Turkey

Notes

References